Andrei Krasnopjorov (born 5 December 1973) is a former Estonian footballer.

Krasnopjorov won two Meistriliiga titles with Lantana Tallinn and had a loan spell at CSKA Moscow in 1999. After playing just one game for the Russian Premier League club, against city rivals Lokomotiv Moscow, Krasnopjorov told then coach Oleg Dolmatov of his inability to cope with the physical pressures at the club and returned to Lantana. His former clubs also include TVMK Tallinn and Levadia Tallinn. Throughout his career, Krasnopjorov has made 203 appearances and scored 10 goals in the Estonian Meistriliiga.

References

External links

1999 stats 

1973 births
Footballers from Tallinn
Estonian people of Russian descent
Living people
FC TVMK players
FCI Levadia Tallinn players
FC Lantana Tallinn players
Nõmme Kalju FC players
Estonian footballers
PFC CSKA Moscow players
Russian Premier League players
Estonian expatriate footballers
Expatriate footballers in Russia
Estonian expatriate sportspeople in Russia
Association football midfielders
Association football fullbacks
Meistriliiga players